Goleo VI, commonly known as Goleo, and Pille, were the official mascots for the 2006 FIFA World Cup in Germany. Goleo takes the form of a lion, and is never found far from his sidekick, Pille, a talking football.

Goleo is clad in a white football shirt with black collar and sleeve rims, similar to those worn by the German national team between the 1950s and 1970s, and is trouserless. He wears a uniform with the number 06 (short for 2006, the World Cup year he was the mascot), and has his name written above it on the back of his shirt. The Goleo costume was manufactured by The Jim Henson Company, at a cost of around €250,000. The word Pille, meaning "pill" in standard German, is otherwise a common German sports jargon for a football. Goleo was unveiled as the World Cup mascot on November 13, 2004, during the German television program Wetten, dass..?, presented by Pelé and Franz Beckenbauer.

On May 16, 2006, the German licence holder to produce Goleo, Bavarian toy company NICI, filed for bankruptcy. One apparent reason could be very high licence fees of around €28 million. Other sources, however, quote much lower licence fees of €3.5 million.

Reception
The choice of a lion was criticized for not being a German animal, but rather the emblem of historical rivals England and the Netherlands. Renowned designer Erik Spiekermann suggested that the mascot should have been an eagle (which appears on Germany's coat of arms) or even a squirrel as a symbol of the nation of frugality in his opinion. Criticism has also been raised of the fact that Goleo does not wear any trousers.

Music appearances
"Love Generation"
He was also featured in the European version of music video for Bob Sinclar's song "Love Generation", which was released in Germany on December 9, 2005, the day of the draw of the World Cup. 

"Dance!"
A computer animated Goleo also appeared in music videos for Lumidee's "Dance!" released in Spring 2006, just in time for the opening ceremonies for the World Cup.

"All Together Now"
Goleo VI also appears in Atomic Kitten's "All Together Now (Strong Together)", also released in the spring of 2006. The song was a remake of a song of 1990 by The Farm, called "All Together Now".

Goleo VI Discography

Featured in

See also 
 FIFA World Cup mascot

References

External links

 FIFA's homepage
 Financial problems with the manufacturer NICI

Mascots introduced in 2004
Lion mascots
German mascots
2006 FIFA World Cup
FIFA World Cup mascots
Fictional balls